This is a list of male goalkeepers who have been named in the national water polo team at the Summer Olympics.

Abbreviations

Winning goalkeepers

The following table is pre-sorted by edition of the Olympics (in ascending order), cap number or name of the goalkeeper (in ascending order), respectively. Last updated: 1 April 2021.

Legend and abbreviation
  – Olympic winning streak (winning three or more Olympic titles in a row)
  – Winning all matches during the tournament
  – Host team
 Team† – Defunct team
 Eff % – Save efficiency (Saves / Shots)

Sources:
 Official Reports (PDF): 1908 (pp. 360–361), 1912 (pp. 1022, 1024, 1033), 1920 (p. 130), 1924 (pp. 488, 490, 492), 1928 (pp. 803–804, 806), 1932 (pp. 646, 649–650), 1936 (pp. 347, 349, 355), 1948 (pp. 643, 645–646), 1952 (pp. 602–603, 606–608), 1956 (pp. 625–626), 1960 (pp. 618–619, 627–628, 631), 1964 (pp. 685, 687, 691, 694–695, 698), 1968 (pp. 812, 814, 816–817, 819, 822, 824, 826), 1972 (pp. 358–359, 363–365), 1976 (pp. 487, 489, 491–492), 1980 (pp. 497, 500–502), 1984 (pp. 528–533), 1988 (pp. 593–595, 597), 1992 (pp. 391–395, 399–400), 1996 (pp. 57–61, 70–71, 73);
 Official Results Books (PDF): 2000 (pp. 45, 50, 55, 78, 81, 84, 87, 90), 2004 (pp. 207–208), 2008 (pp. 202–203), 2012 (pp. 471–472), 2016 (pp. 131–132).

Records and statistics

Multiple appearances

By tournament
The following table is pre-sorted by edition of the Olympics (in ascending order), name of the team (in ascending order), name of the goalkeeper (in ascending order), respectively. Last updated: 1 April 2021.

As of the 2020 Summer Olympics, 52 male goalkeepers have been named in the national water polo team in three or more Olympic tournaments.

Legend
 Team* – Host team

Four-time Olympians
The following table is pre-sorted by number of Olympic appearances (in descending order), year of the last Olympic appearance (in ascending order), year of the first Olympic appearance (in ascending order), date of birth (in ascending order), name of the goalkeeper (in ascending order), respectively. Last updated: 1 April 2021.

Thirteen male goalkeepers have been named in the national water polo tea in four or more Olympic tournaments between 1900 and 2016 inclusive.

Legend and abbreviation
  – Hosts
 Apps – Appearances

Multiple medalists

The following table is pre-sorted by total number of Olympic medals (in descending order), number of Olympic gold medals (in descending order), number of Olympic silver medals (in descending order), year of receiving the last Olympic medal (in ascending order), year of receiving the first Olympic medal (in ascending order), name of the goalkeeper (in ascending order), respectively. Last updated: 1 April 2021.

As of 2016, eight male goalkeepers have won three or more Olympic medals in water polo.

Legend
  – Hosts

Multiple gold medalists

The following table is pre-sorted by number of Olympic gold medals (in descending order), number of Olympic silver medals (in descending order), number of Olympic bronze medals (in descending order), year of receiving the last Olympic gold medal (in ascending order), year of receiving the first Olympic gold medal (in ascending order), name of the player (in ascending order), respectively. Last updated: 1 April 2021.

As of 2016, seven male goalkeepers have won two or more Olympic gold medals in water polo.

Legend
  – Hosts

Most saves

One match

One tournament

All-time

Flag bearers

Some sportspeople were chosen to carry the national flag of their country at the opening and closing ceremonies of the Olympic Games. As of the 2020 Summer Olympics, six male water polo goalkeepers were given the honour.

On 6 July 1912, Charles Smith of Great Britain carried the national flag at the opening ceremony of the 1912 Games in Stockholm, becoming the first water polo player to be a flag bearer at the opening and closing ceremonies of the Olympics. Seven days later, He won his second Olympic gold medal with his teammates.

Zdravko-Ćiro Kovačić, representing Yugoslavia, was the flag bearer during the opening ceremony at the 1956 Summer Olympics in Melbourne.

After winning bronze in the men's tournament, Evert Kroon, the starting goalkeeper of the Dutch water polo team, carried the national flag of the Netherlands at the closing ceremony of the 1976 Montreal Olympics.

Forty years later, Josip Pavić of Croatia was the flag bearer during the opening ceremony at the 2016 Summer Olympics in Rio de Janeiro, becoming the first water polo goalkeeper to be given the honour in the 21st century.

Legend
  – Opening ceremony of the 1912 Summer Olympics
  – Closing ceremony of the 1976 Summer Olympics
  – Hosts
 Flag bearer‡ – Flag bearer who won the tournament with his team

Goalkeepers by team
The following tables are pre-sorted by edition of the Olympics (in ascending order), cap number or name of the goalkeeper (in ascending order), respectively.

Legend
 Year* – As host team
 Team† – Defunct team

Argentina
 Men's national team: 
 Team appearances: 4 (1928, 1948–1952, 1960)
 As host team: —

Australia
 Men's national team: 
 Team appearances: 17 (1948–1964, 1972–1992, 2000*–2020)
 As host team: 1956*, 2000*

Austria
 Men's national team: 
 Team appearances: 3 (1912, 1936, 1952)
 As host team: —

Belgium
 Men's national team: 
 Team appearances: 11 (1900, 1908–1928, 1936–1952, 1960–1964)
 As host team: 1920*

Brazil
 Men's national team: 
 Team appearances: 8 (1920, 1932, 1952, 1960–1968, 1984, 2016*)
 As host team: 2016*
 
Note:
 Slobodan Soro is also listed in section Serbia.

Bulgaria
 Men's national team: 
 Team appearances: 2 (1972, 1980)
 As host team: —

Canada
 Men's national team: 
 Team appearances: 4 (1972–1976*, 1984, 2008)
 As host team: 1976*

Chile
 Men's national team: 
 Team appearances: 1 (1948)
 As host team: —

China
 Men's national team: 
 Team appearances: 3 (1984–1988, 2008*)
 As host team: 2008*
 Last updated: 1 April 2021.

Legend and abbreviation
  – Hosts
 Eff % – Save efficiency (Saves / Shots)

Source:
 Official Results Books (PDF): 2008 (pp. 187–188).

Croatia
 Men's national team: 
 Team appearances: 7 (1996–2020)
 As host team: —
 Related team: Yugoslavia†

Cuba
 Men's national team: 
 Team appearances: 5 (1968–1980, 1992)
 As host team: —

Czechoslovakia
 Men's national team: †
 Team appearances: 5 (1920–1928, 1936, 1992)
 As host team: —
 Related team: Slovakia

East Germany
 Men's national team: †
 Team appearances: 1 (1968)
 As host team: —
 Related teams: Germany, United Team of Germany†
 Last updated: 1 April 2021.

Note:
 Peter Schmidt is also listed in section United Team of Germany.

Egypt
 Men's national team: 
 Team appearances: 6 (1948–1952, 1960–1968, 2004)
 As host team: —

France
 Men's national team: 
 Team appearances: 11 (1900*, 1912–1928, 1936–1948, 1960, 1988–1992, 2016)
 As host team: 1900*, 1924*

Germany
 Men's national team: 
 Team appearances: 9 (1900, 1928–1936*, 1952, 1992–1996, 2004–2008)
 As host team: 1936*
 Related teams: United Team of Germany†, East Germany†, West Germany†
 Last updated: 1 April 2021.

Legend and abbreviation
  – Hosts
 Eff % – Save efficiency (Saves / Shots)

Sources:
 Official Reports (PDF): 1996 (pp. 57–61, 67–69);
 Official Results Books (PDF): 2004 (pp. 199–200), 2008 (pp. 196–197).
Notes:
 Emil Bildstein is also listed in section United Team of Germany.
 Ingo Borgmann is also listed in section West Germany.
 Peter Röhle is also listed in section West Germany.
 Alexander Tchigir is also listed in section Unified Team.

Great Britain
 Men's national team: 
 Team appearances: 11 (1900, 1908*–1928, 1936–1956, 2012*)
 As host team: 1908*, 1948*, 2012*

Greece
 Men's national team: 
 Team appearances: 16 (1920–1924, 1948, 1968–1972, 1980–2020)
 As host team: 2004*

Hungary
 Men's national team: 
 Team appearances: 23 (1912, 1924–1980, 1988–2020)
 As host team: —
 
Note:
 István Gergely is also listed in section Slovakia.

Iceland
 Men's national team: 
 Team appearances: 1 (1936)
 As host team: —

India
 Men's national team: 
 Team appearances: 2 (1948–1952)
 As host team: —

Iran
 Men's national team: 
 Team appearances: 1 (1976)
 As host team: —

Republic of Ireland
 Men's national team: 
 Team appearances: 2 (1924–1928)
 As host team: —

Italy
 Men's national team: 
 Team appearances: 21 (1920–1924, 1948–2020)
 As host team: 1960*

Japan
 Men's national team: 
 Team appearances: 9 (1932–1936, 1960–1972, 1984, 2016–2020)
 As host team: 1964, 2020*

Kazakhstan
 Men's national team: 
 Team appearances: 4 (2000–2004, 2012, 2020)
 As host team: —
 Related teams: Soviet Union†, Unified Team†
 
Note:
 Nikolay Maksimov is also listed in section Russia.

Luxembourg
 Men's national team: 
 Team appearances: 1 (1928)
 As host team: —

Malta
 Men's national team: 
 Team appearances: 2 (1928, 1936)
 As host team: —

Mexico
 Men's national team: 
 Team appearances: 4 (1952, 1968*–1976)
 As host team: 1968*

Montenegro
 Men's national team: 
 Team appearances: 4 (2008–2020)
 As host team: —
 Related teams: Yugoslavia†, FR Yugoslavia†, Serbia and Montenegro†
 
Note:
 Denis Šefik is also listed in section Serbia and Montenegro, and section Serbia.

Netherlands
 Men's national team: 
 Team appearances: 17 (1908, 1920–1928*, 1936–1952, 1960–1984, 1992–2000)
 As host team: 1928*

Portugal
 Men's national team: 
 Team appearances: 1 (1952)
 As host team: —

Romania
 Men's national team: 
 Team appearances: 9 (1952–1964, 1972–1980, 1996, 2012)
 As host team: —

Russia
 Men's national team: 
 Team appearances: 3 (1996–2004)
 As host team: —
 Related teams: Soviet Union†, Unified Team†
 
Note:
 Nikolay Maksimov is also listed in section Kazakhstan.

Serbia
 Men's national team: 
 Team appearances: 4 (2008–2020)
 As host team: —
 Related teams: Yugoslavia†, FR Yugoslavia†, Serbia and Montenegro†
 
Notes:
 Denis Šefik is also listed in section Serbia and Montenegro, and section Montenegro.
 Slobodan Soro is also listed in section Brazil.

Serbia and Montenegro
 Men's national team: †
 Team appearances: 1 (2004)
 As host team: —
 Related teams: Yugoslavia†, FR Yugoslavia†, Montenegro, Serbia
 Last updated: 1 April 2021.

Abbreviation
 Eff % – Save efficiency (Saves / Shots)

Source:
 Official Results Books (PDF): 2004 (pp. 223–224).
Notes:
 Nikola Kuljača is also listed in section FR Yugoslavia.
 Denis Šefik is also listed in section Serbia, and section Montenegro.

Singapore
 Men's national team: 
 Team appearances: 1 (1956)
 As host team: —

Slovakia
 Men's national team: 
 Team appearances: 1 (2000)
 As host team: —
 Related team: Czechoslovakia†
 Last updated: 1 April 2021.

Abbreviation
 Eff % – Save efficiency (Saves / Shots)

Source:
 Official Results Books (PDF): 2000 (pp. 57, 60, 62–63, 68, 70, 73, 77).
Note:
 István Gergely is also listed in section Hungary.

South Africa
 Men's national team: 
 Team appearances: 3 (1952, 1960, 2020)
 As host team: —
 Last updated: 27 July 2021.

Abbreviation
 Eff % – Save efficiency (Saves / Shots)

South Korea
 Men's national team: 
 Team appearances: 1 (1988*)
 As host team: 1988*

Soviet Union
 Men's national team: †
 Team appearances: 9 (1952–1980*, 1988)
 As host team: 1980*
 Related teams: Unified Team†, Kazakhstan, Russia, Ukraine
 Last updated: 1 April 2021.

Legend
  – Hosts

Note:
 Yevgeny Sharonov is also listed in section Unified Team.

Spain
 Men's national team: 
 Team appearances: 18 (1920–1928, 1948–1952, 1968–1972, 1980–2020)
 As host team: 1992*

Sweden
 Men's national team: 
 Team appearances: 8 (1908–1924, 1936–1952, 1980)
 As host team: 1912*

Switzerland
 Men's national team: 
 Team appearances: 5 (1920–1928, 1936–1948)
 As host team: —

Ukraine
 Men's national team: 
 Team appearances: 1 (1996)
 As host team: —
 Related teams: Soviet Union†, Unified Team†
 Last updated: 1 April 2021.

Abbreviation
 Eff % – Save efficiency (Saves / Shots)

Source:
 Official Reports (PDF): 1996 (pp. 62–66, 70–72).

Unified Team
 Men's national team:  Unified Team†
 Team appearances: 1 (1992)
 As host team: —
 Related teams: Soviet Union†, Kazakhstan, Russia, Ukraine
 Last updated: 1 April 2021.

Notes:
 Yevgeny Sharonov is also listed in section Soviet Union.
 Alexander Tchigir is also listed in section Germany.

United States
 Men's national team: 
 Team appearances: 22 (1920–1972, 1984*–2020)
 As host team: 1932*, 1984*, 1996*
 Last updated: 27 July 2021.

Legend and abbreviation
  – Hosts
 Eff % – Save efficiency (Saves / Shots)

Sources:
 Official Reports (PDF): 1996 (pp. 62–66, 70–72);
 Official Results Books (PDF): 2000 (pp. 47, 51, 53, 80, 82, 85, 89–90), 2004 (pp. 231–232), 2008 (pp. 214–215), 2012 (pp. 497–498), 2016 (pp. 133–134).

United Team of Germany
 Men's national team:  United Team of Germany†
 Team appearances: 3 (1956–1964)
 As host team: —
 Related teams: Germany, East Germany†, West Germany†
 Last updated: 1 April 2021.

Notes:
 Emil Bildstein is also listed in section Germany.
 Hans Hoffmeister is also listed in section West Germany.
 Peter Schmidt is also listed in section East Germany.

Uruguay
 Men's national team: 
 Team appearances: 2 (1936–1948)
 As host team: —

West Germany
 Men's national team: †
 Team appearances: 5 (1968–1976, 1984–1988)
 As host team: 1972*
 Related teams: Germany, United Team of Germany†
 Last updated: 1 April 2021.

Legend
  – Hosts

Notes:
 Ingo Borgmann is also listed in section Germany.
 Hans Hoffmeister is also listed in section United Team of Germany.
 Peter Röhle is also listed in section Germany.

Yugoslavia
 Men's national team: †
 Team appearances: 12 (1936–1988)
 As host team: —
 Related teams: Croatia, FR Yugoslavia†, Serbia and Montenegro†, Montenegro, Serbia
 
Note:
 Aleksandar Šoštar is also listed in section FR Yugoslavia.

FR Yugoslavia
 Men's national team: †
 Team appearances: 2 (1996–2000)
 As host team: —
 Related teams: Yugoslavia†, Serbia and Montenegro†, Montenegro, Serbia
 Last updated: 1 April 2021.

Abbreviation
 Eff % – Save efficiency (Saves / Shots)

Sources:
 Official Reports (PDF): 1996 (pp. 57–61, 70–72);
 Official Results Books (PDF): 2000 (pp. 46, 50, 56, 78, 83, 85, 88, 92).
Notes:
 Nikola Kuljača is also listed in section Serbia and Montenegro.
 Aleksandar Šoštar is also listed in section Yugoslavia.

See also
 Water polo at the Summer Olympics

 Lists of Olympic water polo records and statistics
 List of men's Olympic water polo tournament records and statistics
 List of women's Olympic water polo tournament records and statistics
 List of Olympic champions in men's water polo
 List of Olympic champions in women's water polo
 National team appearances in the men's Olympic water polo tournament
 National team appearances in the women's Olympic water polo tournament
 List of players who have appeared in multiple men's Olympic water polo tournaments
 List of players who have appeared in multiple women's Olympic water polo tournaments
 List of Olympic medalists in water polo (men)
 List of Olympic medalists in water polo (women)
 List of men's Olympic water polo tournament top goalscorers
 List of women's Olympic water polo tournament top goalscorers
 List of women's Olympic water polo tournament goalkeepers
 List of Olympic venues in water polo

Notes

References

Sources

ISHOF

External links
 Olympic water polo – Official website

Goalkeepers, Men